Gose is a warm fermented beer that originated in Goslar, Germany. It is usually brewed with at least 50% of the grain bill being malted wheat. Dominant flavours in gose include a lemon sourness, a herbal characteristic, and a strong saltiness (the result of either local water sources or added salt). Gose beers typically do not have prominent hop bitterness, flavours, or aroma. The beers typically have a moderate alcohol content of 4 to 5% ABV.

Because of the use of coriander and salt, gose does not comply with the traditional ingredient regulations in German-speaking countries, but it is allowed an exemption on the grounds of being a regional specialty. It acquires its characteristic sourness through inoculation with Lactobacillus bacteria.

Gose belongs to the same family of sour wheat beers which were once brewed across Northern Germany and the Low Countries. Other beers of this family are Belgian witbier, and Hannover .

History
Gose was first brewed in the early 13th century in the town of Goslar, from which its name derives. It became so popular in Leipzig that local breweries copied the style. By the end of the 1800s, it was considered to be local to Leipzig and there were numerous  (gose taverns) in the city.

Originally, gose was spontaneously fermented. A description in 1740 stated, "" ("Gose ferments itself without the addition of yeast"). Sometime in the 1880s, brewers were achieving the same effect by using a combination of top-fermenting yeast and lactic acid bacteria.

Casks were stored in the cellar with the tap bung closed but the shive hole left open which allows some gas to escape, so that the carbon dioxide (CO2)—a by-product of fermentation from the still-active yeast—could escape. When fermentation had slowed to a point where no CO2 was emerging, the gose was ready to bottle. The barrel was emptied into a tank, whence it was filled into traditional long-necked bottles. These were not closed with a cap or cork, but with a plug of yeast (flor) which naturally rose up the neck as the secondary fermentation continued.

When it was nationalised and closed in 1945, gose disappeared temporarily. In 1949, the tiny  opened at Leipzig; Friedrich Wurzler had worked at the Döllnitz brewery and had known the techniques for brewing gose. Before his death in the late 1950s, Wurzler passed the recipe to his stepson, Guido Pfnister. The brewing of gose continued in the small private brewery, though there appears to have been little demand. By the 1960s there were no more than a couple of pubs in Leipzig and possibly one in Halle that were still selling it. When Pfnister died in 1966 the brewery closed and gose production again ceased.

In the 1980s, Lothar Goldhahn, then restoring the former  "", decided that it was suitable that the revived pub should sell gose. After querying drinkers to ascertain its precise characteristics, Goldhahn searched for a brewery to produce it. The first test brews were made in 1985 and production started in 1986.

After briefly disappearing again in 1988, gose again found popularity. In and around Leipzig, there are several specialised gose breweries again. In addition, the style continues to be brewed outside Germany, most notably in the United States and New Zealand.

References

German beer styles